Bagh Golan (also Romanized as Bāgh Golān; also known as Bāgh Galūn and Bāgh Gholām) is a village in Band-e Zarak Rural District, in the Central District of Minab County, Hormozgan Province, Iran. At the 2006 census, its population was 488, in 101 families.

References 

Populated places in Minab County